Crystal is an unincorporated community in Nye County, Nevada, United States. It is on a paved road that exits from State Route 160. Elevation: 2390 feet. As of late 2005, Crystal had two brothels, the Cherry Patch Ranch and Mabel's Ranch, and the Brothel Art Museum.

In November 2005, former madam Heidi Fleiss said she intended to partner with a brothel owner in order to start a brothel with male prostitutes catering exclusively to female customers.  In 2009, however, she announced that she had abandoned those plans.

See also

References

Unincorporated communities in Nevada
Unincorporated communities in Nye County, Nevada

ar:كريستال، نيفادا
vo:Crystal (Nevada)